FC Seoul is an association football club based in Seoul, South Korea. The club was founded in 1983 under the name Lucky-Goldstar FC. Since 1984, Seoul is competing in the K League 1, the highest level of football in the country. Seoul is one of the most successful clubs in the country, having won six K League 1 titles, two League Cups and FA Cups, and one Super Cup.

FC Seoul's one-club men Go Yo-han is the club's all-time most capped player in official competitions with 440 appearances as of the end of the 2022 season.

Players

The list below includes all FC Seoul players who have made at least 100 official appearances for the club or who have been capped at full international level by their countries. Former captains, individual award winners or club record holders are also included; the reason for inclusion is stated below the table as a note.

The list is initially ordered by the career period. For the list of the club's active players, see FC Seoul's current squad. The table below is updated as of the 2022 season, which concluded in October 2022.

Table headers
 Nationality – If a player played international football, the country/countries he played for are shown. Otherwise, the player's nationality is given as their country of birth.
 Position – Playing position of the player (goalkeeper (GK), defender (DF), midfielder (MF), forward (FW), and utility player (U))
 Club career – The year of the player's first appearance for FC Seoul to the year of his last appearance.
 Appearances – The number of games played. Includes appearances in K League, K League Championship, K League promotion-relegation playoffs, Korean League Cup, Korean FA Cup, Asian Cup Winners' Cup and AFC Champions League.

Notes

See also
List of FC Seoul award winners
List of FC Seoul records and statistics

External links
FC Seoul official website

 
FC Seoul
Association football player non-biographical articles
Seoul